The Golden Fighter Championship (GFC) is a Romanian kickboxing, Muay Thai and mixed martial arts (MMA) promotion founded in 2015 and based in Timișoara, Romania, owned by Alin Fălcuşan. It is the third largest kickboxing promotion in Romania, alongside fellow OSS Fighters.

It has featured fighters such as Bogdan Stoica, Andrei Stoica, Christian Baya, Amansio Paraschiv, Adrian Mitu, and Adrian Maxim, among others.

The Golden Fighter Championship and Pro TV, and its subsidiary Pro X announced a multi-year broadcast deal on 24 September 2019, effectively ending the promotion's Digi Sport partnership. With the new TV deal and expansion in the country, the GFC has increased in popularity, and has achieved greater mainstream media coverage. The promotion also has a long-term contract with FightBox giving GFC a deal in other 60 countries. 

GFS has a partnership with Wu Lin Feng of China since 2017. The GFC are also in partnership with the World Kickboxing and Karate Union (WKU). In August 2022, GFC entered into an official partnership with The Golden Cage MMA.

GFC Events
Each GFC event contains several fights. Traditionally, every event starts off with an opening fight followed by other fights, with the last fight being known as the main event.

See also
 GFC in 2021
 Dynamite Fighting Show
 Colosseum Tournament
 KO Masters
 OSS Fighters

References

External links
 Golden Fighter Championship on Facebook 
 FightBox HD  

 
 

2015 establishments in Romania
Kickboxing organizations 
Mixed martial arts organizations 
Professional Muay Thai organizations
Sports organizations established in 2015 
Companies based in Timișoara